The Abarth-Simca 1300 GT is a sports racing car built by Abarth from 1962 to 1965.

Description

The Abarth-Simca 1300 was the first product born from the collaboration between Carlo Abarth and Simca. The negotiations between the two companies were mediated by the Austrian engineer Rudolf Hruska, who had previously worked with Carlo Abarth at Cisitalia in 1949 and was a technical consultant at Simca in the early 1960s. Simca owner Enrico Pigozzi was looking for a sports partner for his small cars, to be able to make racing versions, then agreed with Abarth to develop a family of cars using the Simca 1000 as a basis. Pigozzi hoped that the collaboration with Abarth could make the Simca brand affirm itself in motor racing.

The Abarth-Simca 1300 was based on the floor of the Simca 1000. The chassis, gearbox, steering, and front and rear axles were retained. The bodywork, on the other hand, was revolutionized with a new design, which followed the shape and rounded lines of coupé like the Fiat-Abarth 850 and Fiat-Abarth 1000. The project was developed by the chief engineer of Abarth Mario Colucci. To create the aluminum bodywork, Carlo Abarth and Colucci relied on small local companies: from 1963 onwards entirely to Carrozzeria Sibona-Basano, before that to Beccaris, both from Turin.

The engine was also completely redesigned. Also mounted at the rear, the displacement was increased to 1.3 liters and the cylinder head was equipped with a twin-shaft distribution, with the adoption of two Weber 45DCOE double-barrel carburetors; thanks to these modifications it delivered 125 hp. The lubrication was dry sump with two oil pumps and a radiator was fitted in the front.

Racing History
The racing version, called Bialbero, was faster by 20 km/h. Gianni Balzarini in 1962 won the uphill race on Mont de la Lure in France and Lucien Bianchi won the Trophée d'Auvergne in the same year, a circuit race in Clermont-Ferrand . Jean Guichet took a victory at the Autumn Cup in Monza, where he won in the GT class. At the 1962 24 Hours of Le Mans, Balzarini shared 1300 with Austrian Franz Albert. The race ended after 30 laps due to a transmission problem. Nine laps first, a second 1300 Bialbero by Frenchman Henri Oreiller and Tommy Spychigerhe retired for the same problem.

Hans Herrmann in 1963 achieved a class victory at the 3 Hours of Daytona and the 12 Hours of Sebring.

Championships
International Grand Touring Championship 1964 - Constructors Division I.
International GT Championship 1965 - Constructors Division I.

References

Abarth vehicles
Fiat vehicles
Simca vehicles
Cars introduced in 1962
Sports cars
Rear-wheel-drive vehicles
Cars of Italy